The Reims-Cessna F406 Caravan II is a turboprop twin engine utility aircraft manufactured and designed by Reims Aviation in cooperation with Cessna.

Design and development
The F406 Caravan II is a twin turboprop engined, fourteen-seat low-wing monoplane of conventional aluminium and steel construction. It is a development of the Cessna 404 Titan with two Pratt & Whitney PT6A turboprop engines. The aircraft first flew on 22 September 1983, and was produced by Reims Aviation until the company's 2013 demise. The F406 is aimed at passenger and small cargo transport, and civilian and military surveillance. For extra cargo capacity, a cargo pod can be fitted to the belly of the aircraft.

Though the F406 is more expensive to operate than single-engine aircraft of the same passenger capacity such as the Cessna 208 Caravan, having two engines makes it comply with European regulations regarding commercial operations, which only allow multi-engine aircraft for commercial instrument flight.

In March 2014, Reims Aviation was acquired by Chinese-owned Continental Motors Inc and renamed ASI Aviation, two remaining incomplete airframes were finished in France before a shift to Mobile, Alabama, with new avionics, electrical and hydraulic systems, a new autopilot and an engine choice of current P&WC PT6A-135 or pistons : Continental GTSIO-520 and/or Continental CD-310 diesel. The Type Certificate transferred only had approval to produce spare parts and not the whole aircraft.

Operators

 Customs and Border Protection Service
 Aerologistics Survey

French Army
Air Saint-Pierre 

Hellenic Coast Guard

Fisheries and Marine Resources
Westair Aviation

Republic of Korea Navy 

HM Coastguard
Environment Agency
RVL Aviation

Specifications

See also

References and notes

 Hoyle, Craig. "World Air Forces Directory". Flight International, 8–14 December 2015, Vol. 188, No. 5517. pp. 26–53.
Taylor, John W.R. Jane's All The World's Aircraft 1988–89. Coulsdon, UK:Jane's Defence Data, 1988. .

External links

 Reims Aviation (official website)

Caravan II
1980s French civil utility aircraft
Low-wing aircraft
Aircraft first flown in 1983
Twin-turboprop tractor aircraft